AZL, azl, or variant, may refer to:

 Arizona League, a rookie-level Minor League Baseball summer rookie league based in Arizona
 Africa One (ICAO airline code: AZL; callsign: SKY AFRICA), a defunct Zambian airline; see List of airline codes (A)
 Fazenda Tucunaré Airport (IATA airport code: AZL; ICAO airport code: SWTU), Sapezal, Mato Grosso, Brazil; see List of airports by IATA code: A
 Federal Customs Administration (AZL) of Switzerland, see Swiss Border Guard
 American Z Line (model trains), a company making Z-scale model rail, see Z scale
 'Azl the withdrawal method under Islamic jurisprudence
 Anti Zealot League (moderate right wing) activists against extreme zealous protestors

See also

 AZI (disambiguation)
 AZ1 (disambiguation)
 ALZ (disambiguation)
 Laz (disambiguation)
 LZA (disambiguation)
 Zal (disambiguation)
 ZLA, Los Angeles Air Route Traffic Control Center